Peter's climbing salamander  or Peter's mushroomtongue salamander  (Bolitoglossa adspersa) is a species of salamander in the family Plethodontidae.
It is endemic to Colombia.
Its natural habitats are subtropical or tropical moist montane forests and subtropical or tropical high-altitude grassland.
It is threatened by habitat loss.

References

adspersa
Amphibians of Colombia
Endemic fauna of Colombia
Taxonomy articles created by Polbot
Amphibians described in 1863
Taxa named by Wilhelm Peters